Yasser Musa (born 17 July 1970) is a Belizean visual artist, teacher, poet and publisher.

Background 

The son of former Belizean Prime Minister Said Musa, Yasser Musa was born in Belize City. He was educated in Belize City at St. John's College Junior College. It was after he graduated in 1989 that he debuted in the Belizean art world with his poetry book poems. In 1992, along with Belizean musician and now owner of Belize's most successful record company Stonetree Records, Ivan Duran, Musa presented Minus 8. It featured multimedia pieces and was the first of its kind in Belize. He went on to study at a university in New Orleans. There in 1995 he presented his first solo visual art exhibit, Coming Out, with 50 paintings.

In 1995, Yasser Musa developed the Image Factory Art Foundation. The Art Foundation features a gallery which hosts exhibits from local, regional and international artists. The Factory, as most people call it, is located on 91 North Front Street in Belize City, and has functioned as a space for workshops, classes, residencies and exhibits.

landings 

The Minus series would later go counting down to a major international exhibit ZERO, new Belizean art which opened in the Olimpo in Mérida Yucatán, to a large crowd and would eventually garner 17,000 visitors.  landings was a series of exhibits, ten in all, which featured artists from the Caribbean and Central America. The exhibits mostly featured installation and photography. Each exhibit was launched with a forum for artists and audience to discuss the current situation of contemporary art in the region. Yasser Musa along with landings curator Joan Duran, editors Tristan Donald and Marisol Rodriguez at the close of the last exhibit began the vigorous work of the CONTAINER Collection, the first of a series of 10 manifested as a 400-page book.
On September 6, 2013, along with Joan Duran and Kency Cornejo, Musa launched the CONTAINER Collection 001. The last landings presentation was in 2010.

Exhibitions 

Musa has participated in several exhibitions both individually and collectively. He has exhibited in Belize, Cuba, México, Taiwan, Costa Rica, Portugal, Spain, the Dominican Republic and the United States.
Belize @ 31 in Iowa, Bing Davis Memorial Gallery, Iowa, US, 2012
el Fleco+Vixens, Bitches and Whores, Image Factory Art Foundation, Belize City, Belize, 2011
landings 10, mi-kunuku-farm, Benque Viejo del Carmen, Belize, 2009
YM@20 yrs, Image Factory, Belize City, Belize, 2009
landings 9, Image Factory Art Foundation, Belize City, Belize, 2008
landings 8, Taipei Fine Arts Museum, Taipei, Taiwan, 2008
landings 7, Casa de las Americas/Galería Hayddée Santamaría, La Habana, Cuba, 2007
landings 6, Casa de las Americas/Galería Latinoamericana, La Habana, Cuba, 2007
landings 5, Art Museum of the Americas, Washington D.C., U.S.A., 2007
landings 4, Museo de Arte Contemporáneo, San José, Costa Rica, 2007
landings 3, Centro León, Santiago de los Caballeros, la República Dominicana, 2006
landings 2, Centro de Arte Visuales, Mérida, Yucatán, México, 2006
landings 1, Conkal Arte Contemporáneo, Conkal, Yucatán, México, 2004 (3)
North Front Street Project, 9th Havana Biennial, La Habana, Cuba, 2006
Zero, New Belizean Art, Mérida, Yucatán, México, 2000
Minus 5, Contemporary Arts Center, New Orleans, 1995
Coming Out, Image Factory Art Foundation, Belize City, Belize, 1995
Minus 8, Bliss Institute, Belize City, Belize,  August, 1992

Poetry 

Yasser Musa has published works of poetry:
How to Receive a Gift, 2011
Limited Anxiety, 2010
Loose Electricity, 2009
The Miami Poem, 2000
The Belize City Poem, 1996
Poems, 1989

References

External links 

http://www.yassermusa.com/artist-info.html
http://www.yassermusa.com/writing.html
http://www.postlandings.com
http://www.imagefactorybelize.com

1970 births
Belizean artists
Belizean poets
Children of national leaders
Living people
People from Belize City
Belizean people of Palestinian descent
21st-century Belizean writers